Voivodeship road 107 (abbreviated DW 107) is a route in the Polish voivodeship roads network. The route runs through Kamień County (Gmina Dziwnów, Gmina Kamień Pomorski and Gmina Wolin).

Important settlements along the route

Dziwnówek
Wrzosowo
Kamień Pomorski
Rzewnowo
Jarzysław
Rekowo
Dobropole
Parłówko

Route plan

References

107